Mary White is a 1977 made-for-TV period biographical movie directed by Jud Taylor about American newspaper editor and author William Allen White (played by Ed Flanders) and his teenage daughter Mary (played by Kathleen Beller), who died at age 16 in a horseback riding accident. The film is based on the true story of White's daughter Mary Katherine, who died in 1921 and was the subject of a well-known eulogy written by her father.

Caryl Ledner won the Emmy Award ® for Best Teleplay, Movie-For-Television, in the 1977-78 season.  The film often appeared on television in the 1980s, and is now on DVD.

Plot
In Emporia, Kansas, in the late 1910s and early 1920s, Mary Katherine White, a teenage girl, comes of age. Having grown up in wealth and privilege, as a result she meets famous people of the day. In 1921, at age 16, she dies in a riding accident. Her story is recounted in flashback style by her father, a famous editor, author and publisher.

Cast
Ed Flanders - William Allen White
Fionnula Flanagan - Sallie White
Kathleen Beller - Mary White
Tim Matheson - William L. White
Donald Moffat - Sir James Barrie
Diana Dill - Jane Addams
Kaki Hunter - Selina

References

External links

1977 films
1977 television films
1970s biographical films
1970s teen films
ABC network original films
Films scored by Leonard Rosenman
Films directed by Jud Taylor
Films set in the 1910s
Films set in the 1920s
Films set in Kansas
American biographical films
American television films
American teen films
1970s American films